Miloš Malivojević (born 29 May 1993) is an association football player who plays for Italian Serie B club Vicenza.

Career

Parma
Born in Scandiano, Emilia region, Italy, Malivojević started his career at Emilian club Parma. He was the member of the under-17 team in 2009–10 season. He scored 2 goals in 2010 , which he was the top-scorer of Parma in the tournament as well as the joint-third among the players. In 2010–11 season he returned to Scandiano for Scandianese Calcio. However, he was suffered from groin injury and missed 3 months. After the season Malivojević returned to Parma for its reserve (the under-20 team).

On 4 July 2012 Malivojević left for Italian fourth level club Renate along with Davide Adorni, Antonio Santurro and Emiliano Storani.

Malivojević was a substitute for Renate in the promotion play-offs first round (semi-finals), both replacing Marco Gaeta at half-time, who plays as a wing forward in the 4–3–3 formation. Eventually Renate lost 1–2 in aggregate to Venezia.

Vicenza
In June 2013 Malivojević was sold to Italian third level club Vicenza Calcio in co-ownership, with Mattia Sandrini moved to opposite direction also in co-ownership. Both 50% registration rights of Malivojević and Sandrini were "valued" €600,000 Malivojević signed a 5-year contract.

He injured his feet in May 2014.

In 2014–15 season Malivojević also played a few friendly games in pre-season. However, on 1 September 2014 Malivojević and team-mate Davide D'Appolonia were left for Savoia on temporary deals.

References

External links
 AIC profile (data by football.it) 

Italian footballers
Parma Calcio 1913 players
A.C. Renate players
L.R. Vicenza players
Association football midfielders
Serie C players
Italian people of Serbian descent
People from Scandiano
1993 births
Living people
Serb diaspora sportspeople
Footballers from Emilia-Romagna
Sportspeople from the Province of Reggio Emilia